Gaoua is a market town in southern Burkina Faso known for its superstitious values and customs.
The population, rested at 45,284. (2019 census) 
Located in the red earth, green hills, and fast flowing streams of southwestern Burkina Faso, Gaoua is the capital of Poni Province and forms a sort of capital for the sacred rites and bush lore of the Lobi peoples. According to local myth, Gaoua was founded when the Lobi migrated across from northern Ghana where they found the Gan people peoples occupying the territory. As a result, they named the trek across to Gaoua Gan-houo meaning "route of the Gan people".

Attractions in the town include a sacred grove of trees, the Poni Museum (Musée des Civilisations des Peuples du Sud-Ouest or Musée du Poni) and caves. There is also a mosque on elevated ground near the centre. The Gaoua Catholic parish Church of the Sacred Heart will be the cathedral for the newly erected Catholic Diocese of Gaoua.

Lobi Goldfields
Though their ancient home was considered to be Takyiman in Ghana, the Lobi migrated across the Mouhoun River as a result of the Dagomba Wars in the 1770s.  Thirty years later, the Lobi displaced the Gan at Gaoua.  The French occupied southwest Burkina Faso in 1879, based on the region's reputation for gold, dating back to the era of Mossi and Dyula gold traders.  Although primarily farmers, the Lobi did partake of gold panning around Gaoua, besides Gaoua being on a trade route to the Poura gold mines further north.

See also
Birimian
Geology of Burkina Faso

References

External links

Populated places in the Sud-Ouest Region (Burkina Faso)
Sacred groves